UFC on Fox: Dillashaw vs. Barão 2 (also known as UFC on Fox 16) was a mixed martial arts event held on July 25, 2015, at the United Center in Chicago, Illinois.

Background
The event was headlined by a UFC Bantamweight Championship rematch between current champion T.J. Dillashaw and former champion Renan Barão. Their first fight took place at UFC 173 which ended in a fifth round technical knockout victory for Dillashaw that won him the title. Prior to this event, the rematch had been rescheduled for two other events. The first of which was UFC 177, where Barão withdrew from the bout on the day of weigh-ins, as he had to be admitted to a hospital as a result of his attempts to cut weight. The second was UFC 186, where Dillashaw withdrew from the bout due to a broken rib.

Former UFC Lightweight champion Anthony Pettis was expected to face Myles Jury at the event. However, Pettis pulled out of the bout on May 7 due to an elbow injury and was replaced by Edson Barboza. In turn, Jury pulled out the bout on June 9 due to an injury and was replaced by Paul Felder.

A lightweight bout between Danny Castillo and Rustam Khabilov that was previously scheduled for UFC 182 was expected to take place at this event. However, once again, Khabilov was pulled from the bout due to complications with his visa. Castillo remained on the card against Jim Miller.

Erik Koch was expected to face Ramsey Nijem at the event. However, Koch pulled out of the bout in late June due to an injury and was replaced by promotional newcomer Andrew Holbrook.

Antônio Braga Neto was expected to face Zak Cummings at this event. However, Neto pulled out of the bout in early July due to an injury and was replaced by promotional newcomer Dominique Steele.

Results

Bonus awards
The following fighters were awarded $50,000 bonuses:
Fight of the Night: Edson Barboza vs. Paul Felder
Performance of the Night: T.J. Dillashaw and Tom Lawlor

See also
List of UFC events
2015 in UFC

References

Fox UFC
Events in Chicago
Mixed martial arts in Chicago
Sports competitions in Chicago
2015 in mixed martial arts
July 2015 sports events in the United States